Bloomfield may refer to:

People
 Bloomfield (surname)

Places

Australia
 Bloomfield, Queensland, a town and locality in the Shires of Cook and Douglas
 Bloomfield River, in Queensland

Canada
 Bloomfield, Carleton County, New Brunswick
 Bloomfield, Kings County, New Brunswick
 Bloomfield, Newfoundland and Labrador
 Bloomfield, Ontario
 Bloomfield, Prince Edward Island
 Bloomfield Provincial Park

United Kingdom
 Bloomfield (Bangor suburb), Northern Ireland
 Bloomfield, Belfast, an electoral ward of East Belfast, Northern Ireland

United States
 Bloomfield, Arkansas, in Benton County
 Bloomfield, California
 North Bloomfield, California, former name Bloomfield
 Bloomfield, Connecticut
 Bloomfield (St. Georges, Delaware), a historic home listed on the National Register of Historic Places
 Bloomfield, Indiana, a town in Greene County
 Bloomfield, Jay County, Indiana, an unincorporated community
 Bloomfield, Spencer County, Indiana, an unincorporated community
 Bloomfield, Iowa
 Bloomfield, Kentucky
 Sharpsburg, Kentucky, formerly known as Bloomfield
 Bloomfield, Missouri
 Bloomfield, Montana
 Bloomfield, Nebraska
 Bloomfield, New Jersey
 Bloomfield College
 Bloomfield (NJT station), a New Jersey Transit station
 Bloomfield, New Mexico
 Bloomfield, New York, a village in Ontario County
 Bloomfield, Staten Island, New York
 Bloomfield, Morrow County, Ohio, an unincorporated community
 Bloomfield, Muskingum County, Ohio, an unincorporated community
 Bloomfield, Washington County, Ohio, an unincorporated community
 Bloomfield, Pennsylvania, a borough in Perry County
 Bloomfield (Pittsburgh), Pennsylvania
 Bloomfield, Vermont
 Bloomfield, Virginia
 Bloomfield (Herndon, Virginia), also known as Holly Knoll, a historic home located in Fairfax County
 Bloomfield (village), Wisconsin, in Walworth County
 Bloomfield, Walworth County, Wisconsin, a town
 Bloomfield, Waushara County, Wisconsin, a town
 Bloomfield Hills, Michigan
 Bloomfield Township (disambiguation), several townships
 East Bloomfield, New York
 New Bloomfield, Missouri
 North Bloomfield, California
 North Bloomfield, Ohio
 South Bloomfield, Ohio
 West Bloomfield, New York
 West Bloomfield Township, Michigan

Sports
 Bloomfield Stadium, a football (soccer) stadium in Tel Aviv, Israel
 Bloomfield Road, a football (soccer) stadium in Blackpool, England
 Bloomfield Cricket and Athletic Club, a major cricket team in Colombo, Sri Lanka

Coal mines
 Bloomfield Colliery, in Tipton, England, site of a Watt steam engine
 Bloomfield, a coal mine in Australia operated by Bloomfield Collieries; See Coal companies of Australia

Other uses
 Bloomfield (microprocessor), a processor marketed under the Intel Core i7 name
 Bloomfield (film), a 1971 film
 Bloomfield Academy (Oklahoma), a school in the Chickasaw Nation, (Indian Territory), near the present town of Achille, Oklahoma

See also
 Bloomfield High School (disambiguation)
 Blumenfeld, a surname
 Blumfeld, an indie-pop band from Germany
 Broomfield (disambiguation)